The Bugalugs Bum Thief (1991) is a children's novel by Australian author Tim Winton.

Story 
The Bugalugs Bum Thief is a comedic mystery story about Skeeta Anderson. When Skeeta wakes to find his bum is missing he discovers that everyone in Bugalugs is also missing their bum. Skeeta decides to find the bum thief.

Review 
Reviews by readers :I really enjoyed this book. It was very quick to read, but it was fun. I would recommend this book for younger readers and older readers who are looking for a quick, funny read. My mum ejoyed [sic] reading it to my youger[sic] brother and sister as well.The book is OK, but only if you are interested in bums. My younger bro liked it, so its probably best for kids around 4-7 that love bums.Hilarious! I laughed my bum off!

Theatrical Adaptation 
The monkey baa theatre company has toured extensively with a production of The Bugalugs Bum Thief. The first tour was in schools New South Wales (NSW) in 1988 followed by a second tour in 1989 through NSW, ACT, Victoria, and Tasmania to schools, libraries and community halls. During that tour they also staged performances at Glen Street Theatre in Sydney. They toured again in 2002  to 13 theatres in New South Wales, the ACT and to the Arts Centre, Melbourne.

In 2005 and 2006 they toured the production in Queensland in conjunction with the Queensland Arts Council.

There were further monkey baa productions staged at several venues in Sydney Theatres in April - May 2015.

Series 
Aussie Bites - a series of Australian children's books published by Puffin.

Awards 
 1994 Winner CROW Award (Children Reading Outstanding Writers): Focus list (Years 3-5)
 1998 Winner YABBA Awards: Fiction for Younger Readers

References 

1991 Australian novels
Novels by Tim Winton
Australian children's novels
Children's mystery novels
1991 children's books